The 1925–26 Scottish Districts season is a record of all the rugby union matches for Scotland's district teams.

History

The Inter-City match was cancelled due to frost.

The final trial match of December 1925 was abandoned, fifteen minutes before kick off, due to frost and not played.

Results

Inter-City

No match played.

Other Scottish matches

Midlands District:

Edinburgh District:

Trial matches

Scotland Probables:

Scotland Possibles:

English matches

No other District matches played.

International matches

No touring matches this season.

References

1925–26 in Scottish rugby union
Scottish Districts seasons